The Real Housewives of Johannesburg (abbreviated RHOJ) is a South African reality television series that premiered on M-Net's rebranded channel, 1Magic, on 3 August 2018 to 17 January 2020.

Developed as an international installment of the American The Real Housewives franchise and the first installment of the franchise set in Africa. It has aired two seasons and focuses on the personal and professional lives of several women living in Johannesburg, South Africa.

The season two cast consists of Christall Kay, Brinnette Seopela, Lebo JoJo Mokoena, Lethabo Mathatho, Mpho Merriweather, Mpumi Mophatlane and Tarina Patel. It will be renewed for season 3 soon.

Overview & casting
The Real Housewives of Johannesburg was first rumoured in 2014. Another company took over production – repurposing some of the footage and reshooting with an added cast member to create the critically panned Divas of Jozi, which premiered on SABC3 in 2016. In January 2018, as part of M-Net's ongoing rebrand of their Vuzu Amp channel to 1Magic – it was announced that they had secured an official version of the Real Housewives franchise, to premiere within the year.

On December 7, 2021, original cast-member Naledi Willers died at the age of 30 after suffering from breast cancer.

Season 1 
In July 2018, the season one cast was announced.

The first season premiered on August 3, 2018, with Evodia Mogase, Mercy Mogase, Christall Kay, Brinnette Seopela, Naledi Willers  Busisiwe 'Lendy' Ter Mors joining the cast.

On November 23, 2018, the series was renewed for a second season.

Season 2 
On May 23, 2019, both mother and daughter, Evodia & Mercy Mogase, announced their departure from the show.

On September 18, 2019, the cast of the second season was announced.

The second season premiered on October 18, 2019, with Lebo JoJo Mokoena, Lethabo Mathatho, Mpho Merriweather, Mpumi Mophatlane and Tarina Patel joining Christall Kay and Brinnette Seopela.

Season 3 
In April 2021, it was revealed that production for the third season had been halted due to a physical altercation between Christall Kay and Brinnette Seopela.

In November 2022, Mzansi Magic confirmed the series is set to return with a brand new cast in 2023.

Cast

Timeline of housewives

Episodes

Series overview

Season 1 (2018)

Season 2 (2019-20)

Broadcast 
In South Africa, the first season began airing episodes on 1Magic on 3 August 2018. The second season premiered on 18 October 2019. 

The show also airs on Media24's Honey on 10 May 2021.

International broadcast
In Australia, the series premiered on Arena, on subscription service Foxtel, on 7 July 2019.

In Canada, the series airs on cable channel Slice.

On January 19, 2022, the first two seasons became available in the United States for the first time on Discovery+ with a subscription. It has also become available to Tubi on April 1, 2022.

References

External links
 Official Program Page

South African television series based on American television series
2018 South African television series debuts
South African reality television series
Johannesburg
Women in South Africa
Culture of Johannesburg